Mark John Bowick (born 1957) is a theoretical physicist in condensed matter theory and high energy physics. He is the deputy director of the Kavli Institute for Theoretical Physics at the University of California, Santa Barbara, and a Visiting Distinguished Professor of Physics in UCSB's Physics Department.

Early life and education 
Bowick was born in Rotorua, New Zealand, and earned his bachelor's degree, B.Sc. (Hons.), at the University of Canterbury in Christchurch. In 1983, he received his Ph.D. in theoretical physics from the California Institute of Technology, where he held an Earle C. Anthony Graduate Fellowship.

Professional career 
Bowick then spent three years at Yale University as the research associate of their Sloane Physics Lab's "Particle Theory Group," followed by a two-year postdoctoral position at the Center for Theoretical Physics, at MIT.

He was awarded first prize in the 1986 Gravity Research Foundation Essay Competition. In 1987, he joined the faculty of the Physics Department at Syracuse University, where he was granted an Outstanding Junior Investigator award, from the United States Department of Energy, for the years 1987 to 1994. At Syracuse, Bowick served as assistant and associate professor from 1987 to 1998, was promoted to full professor of physics in 1998, and went on to become Director of the Soft Matter Program from 2011 to 2016.

In August 2016, the Kavli Institute for Theoretical Physics, at the University of California, Santa Barbara, invited Bowick to join as deputy director and Visiting Distinguished Professor of Physics.

Research 
Bowick's research interests include symmetry breaking, the interplay of order and geometry,  topological defects, building blocks for supramolecular self-assembly, membrane statistical mechanics, shaped structures, and common themes in condensed matter and particle physics.

Since 2002, his career has been split between high-energy physics and condensed matter physics, with ongoing research support by the National Science Foundation.

Honors and awards 
 First prize in the Gravity Research Foundation Essay Competition (1986)
 Outstanding Junior Investigator, United States Department of Energy (1987–1994)
 Fellow of the American Physical Society, Division of Condensed Matter Physics (elected 2004)
 Fellow of the American Association for the Advancement of Science (elected 2022).

Syracuse honored Bowick with two commendations: the Chancellor's Citation for Exceptional Academic Achievement in 2006, and the William Wasserstrom Prize for Excellence in Graduate Teaching and Advising in 2009. He was also named the Joel Dorman Steele Professor of Physics in 2013.

Personal life
Bowick is married to theoretical physicist M. Cristina Marchetti. They have two adult children.

In 2016, while director of Syracuse University's Soft Matter Program, Bowick commissioned composer Andrew Waggoner to write music for their Active And Smart Matter Conference: A New Frontier for Science & Engineering. The world premiere of this eclectic composition, entitled Hexacorda Mollia, was performed by the JACK Quartet on June 22, 2016.

Selected publications 
 Bowick, MJ and LCR Wijewardhana, Superstrings at High Temperature, Physical Review Letters 54 (23), 2485 (1985).
 Bowick, MJ, and TW Appelquist, D Karabali,  LCR Wijewardhana, Spontaneous chiral-symmetry breaking in three-dimensional QED, Physical Review D 33 (12), 3704 (1986).
 Bowick, MJ, and L Chandar, EA Schiff, AM Srivastava, The Cosmological Kibble Mechanism in the Laboratory – String Formation in Liquid-Crystals, Science 263 (5149), 943–944 (1994).
 Bowick, MJ and A Travesset, The statistical mechanics of membranes, Physics Reports 344 (4-6), 255–308 (2001).
 Bowick, MJ, and AR Bausch, A Cacciuto, AD Dinsmore, MF Hsu, DR Nelson, ... Grain boundary scars and spherical crystallography, Science 299 (5613), 1716–1718 (2003).
 Bowick, MJ and L Giomi, Two-Dimensional Matter: Order, Curvature and Defects, Advances in Physics 58 (5), 449–563 (2009).
 Bowick MJ, and L Giomi, X Ma, MC Marchetti, Defect annihilation and proliferation in active nematics, Physics Review Letters 110 (22), 228101 (2013).
 Bowick, MJ, and FC Keber, E Loiseau, T Sanchez, SJ DeCamp, L Giomi, ... Topology and dynamics of active nematic vesicles, Science 345 (6201), 1135–1139 (2014).

References

External links 
Group webpage at Kavli Institute for Theoretical Physics
 Mark Bowick on Google Scholar

1957 births
20th-century American physicists
21st-century American physicists
New Zealand physicists
Living people
People from Rotorua
California Institute of Technology alumni
University of California, Santa Barbara faculty
Particle physicists
Theoretical physicists
Syracuse University faculty
Fellows of the American Physical Society
University of Canterbury alumni
Topological dynamics
American condensed matter physicists
Fellows of the American Association for the Advancement of Science